Alan Stuart Weakley (born 1957) is an American botanist with expertise in the systematics, ecology, and conservation of the flora of the Southeastern United States. Weakley is the director of the UNC Herbarium at the North Carolina Botanical Garden and an adjunct associate professor at the University of North Carolina at Chapel Hill. He is the author of Flora of the Southern & Mid-Atlantic States, a manual covering the approximately 7000 vascular plants found in the Southeastern United States.

, the International Plant Names Index lists 56 names published by Weakley.

References

Botanists active in North America
20th-century American botanists
21st-century American botanists
Living people
1957 births